Gorgyrella is a genus of African armored trapdoor spiders that was first described by William Frederick Purcell in 1902.

Species
 it contains four species and one subspecies:
Gorgyrella hirschhorni (Hewitt, 1919) – Zimbabwe
Gorgyrella inermis Tucker, 1917 – Tanzania
Gorgyrella namaquensis Purcell, 1902 (type) – South Africa
Gorgyrella schreineri Purcell, 1903 – South Africa
Gorgyrella s. minor (Hewitt, 1916) – South Africa

See also
 List of Idiopidae species

References

External links

Idiopidae
Mygalomorphae genera
Spiders of Africa
Taxa named by William Frederick Purcell